The 1995 Eurocard Open was a men's tennis tournament played on indoor carpet courts, was the only edition of the Essen Masters held in Essen, Germany. Although it was the 1st and only edition of the Essen tournament, the tournament had been held in Stuttgart on six previous occasions. It was part of the Championship Series of the 1995 ATP Tour and was held from 23 October until 30 October 1995. Third-seeded Thomas Muster won the singles title.

Finals

Singles

 Thomas Muster defeated  MaliVai Washington, 7–6(8–6), 2–6, 6–3, 6–4
It was Muster's 12th title of the year and 35th of his career.

Doubles

 Jacco Eltingh /  Paul Haarhuis defeated  Cyril Suk /  Daniel Vacek, 7–5, 6–7, 6–4

References

External links
 ITF tournament edition details

 

Eurocard Open
 October
1995 in German tennis